Helen MacDonald may refer to:

 Helen MacDonald (Prince Edward Island politician) (born 1947), member of the Prince Edward Island Legislative Assembly, 2000–2007
 Helen MacDonald of Glenaladale (died ca 1803), estate manager on Prince Edward Island
 Helen MacDonald (Nova Scotia politician), Canadian politician, former leader of the New Democrats
 Helen Macdonald (writer), British author, winner of 2014 Costa Book Awards